Mikhail Elgin and Igor Zelenay were the defending champions, but Zelenay did not participate that year. Elgin played alongside Michal Mertiňák and they lost in the quarterfinals to Henri Kontinen and Jarkko Nieminen, who won the title, defeating Dustin Brown and Philipp Marx in the final, 7–5, 5–7, [10–5].

Seeds

Draw

References 
 Draw

IPP Open - Doubles
2013 Doubles